Armintomys is an extinct genus of rodent from North America related to jerboas and jumping mice.  It is the only genus in the family Armintomyidae. It lived during the early Eocene, and is the oldest known example of a  hystricomorphous zygomasseteric dentition. In addition, Armintomys is also the oldest known rodent that had an incisor enamel transition from pauciserial to uniserial. Its remains have only been found in the Wind River Basin in Wyoming, and could be found there during the species' existence on Earth. It was previously assumed that Armintomys belonged to the Dipodoidea family, but has since been understood to have been part of an early radiation of dipodoid rodents, but was not directly ancestral to any later dipodoids, thus it was recategorized into its own family.

References

Eocene rodents
Eocene mammals of North America
Fossil taxa described in 1990